De'Teri Mayes (born August 5, 1974) is a former Austrian-American professional basketball player.

Professional career
Mayes played in the top-tier level Austrian league, the ÖBL, with the Allianz Swans Gmunden, from the 1999–2000 season, through the 2010–11 season. He also played two seasons with the Austrian club Kapfenberg Bulls, after he signed with them in 2011. He won five Austrian ÖBL Most Valuable Player awards, two ÖBL Finals MVP awards, and two Austrian Cup MVP awards, in his career, which makes him one of the best players ever to have played in Austria.

Honours
Austria 
Österreichische Bundesliga (4): 2004–05, 2005–06, 2006–07, 2009–10
Austrian Cup (3): 2002–03, 2003–04, 2007–08
Austrian Supercup (4): 2004, 2005, 2006, 2007
Individual awards:
ÖBL Most Valuable Player (5): 2002–03, 2003–04, 2005–06, 2006–07, 2009–10
ÖBL Finals MVP (2): 2006–07, 2009–10
Austrian Cup MVP (2): 2003–04, 2007–08
Austrian Supercup MVP (2): 2005, 2006
ÖBL All-Star (5): 2001, 2003, 2004, 2005, 2006

References

External links
Profile at eurobasket.com
Profile at fiba.com

1987 births
Living people
American expatriate basketball people in Austria
American men's basketball players
Austrian men's basketball players
Basketball players from Montgomery, Alabama
Junior college men's basketball players in the United States
Kapfenberg Bulls players
Murray State Racers men's basketball players
Shooting guards
Swans Gmunden players
Wallace State Lions men's basketball players